Global Vehicle Trust (GVT) was established to provide simple, affordable, and versatile transport for rural areas in developing countries.

History

Global Vehicle Trust was founded by Sir Torquil Norman as a not-for-profit to develop a prototype vehicle suitable for rural parts of developing countries. The Global Vehicle Trust is part owner of OX Delivers, the developer and IP owner of the OX truck. The trust is a not-for-profit company limited by guarantee.

OX Truck
The OX was originally conceived by Sir Gordon Murray for GVT and has now been developed by OX Delivers. This has been done with the support of grants from Innovate UK and Advanced Propulsion Centre.

Designed as an innovative flat-pack product, the truck is a high capacity pickup designed for use on poorly maintained and unpaved roads often found in rural areas of emerging markets. The structure is made of Engineered Laminated Panels bonded to a steel frame.

References

External links

Rural development
Development charities based in the United Kingdom